Kenneth Scott Hannan (born January 23, 1979) is a Canadian former professional ice hockey player. Hannan was born in Richmond, British Columbia, but grew up in Surrey, British Columbia.

Playing career
As a youth, Hannan played in the 1992 Quebec International Pee-Wee Hockey Tournament with a minor ice hockey team from Surrey, British Columbia.

Hannan was selected in the first round of the 1997 NHL Entry Draft, 23rd overall, by the San Jose Sharks from the Kelowna Rockets of the Western Hockey League (WHL). He made his professional debut at the start of the 1998–99 season with the Sharks, playing in five games before returning to the Rockets for his last year of junior eligibility. Hannan then split the 1999–2000 season, his first full professional season, with the Sharks and their American Hockey League (AHL) affiliate, the Kentucky Thoroughblades.

Hannan became a mainstay on the Sharks' defence corps from the 2000–01 season and evolved as an effective, gritty, shut-down defenceman, earning a selection to the 2001 NHL All-Star Game for the Western Conference in the 2003–04 season. Hannan emerged as a premier defenceman during the 2004 Stanley Cup playoffs, gaining praise for his performance in shutting down star Colorado Avalanche centre Peter Forsberg in the Western Conference Semi-final over Colorado. Hannan played his 500th NHL game at the end of the 2006–07 season in a 4–3 loss to the Avalanche on March 18, 2007.

On July 1, 2007, Hannan signed a four-year, $18 million contract with the Colorado Avalanche.

On November 30, 2010, Hannan was traded from Colorado to the Washington Capitals in exchange for Tomáš Fleischmann.

On August 13, 2011, the Calgary Flames signed Hannan as a free agent to a one-year, $1 million contract.

On August 17, 2012, the Nashville Predators signed Hannan as a free agent to a one-year, $1 million contract.

On April 3, 2013, Hannan returned to the San Jose Sharks via trade in exchange for a conditional seventh round draft pick in 2013. Hannan became an unrestricted free agent after the season's end, and on July 5, 2013, but eventually he re-signed with the Sharks on a one-year contract. He played his 1,000th career NHL game on October 14, 2014, against the Washington Capitals.

Hannan announced his retirement on February 24, 2016, after 16 seasons in the NHL.

Career statistics

Regular season and playoffs

International

Awards and honours

References

External links

1979 births
Calgary Flames players
Canadian ice hockey defencemen
Colorado Avalanche players
Sportspeople from Surrey, British Columbia
Kelowna Rockets players
Living people
Nashville Predators players
National Hockey League first-round draft picks
People from Richmond, British Columbia
San Jose Sharks draft picks
San Jose Sharks players
Tacoma Rockets players
Washington Capitals players
Ice hockey people from British Columbia
20th-century Canadian people
21st-century Canadian people